Motherlode is an album by American singer-songwriter Sara Hickman, released in 2006. It is her first double album.

Track listing

The Mirror (Disc 1)

The Thread (Disc 2) 
"Birdhouse" (Hickman/Batteau) – 4:55
"Two Days Today" (Hickman) – 4:18
"Learn You Like a Book" (Boyd/Mitchell) – 4:04
"Are We Ever Gonna Have Sex Again?" (Rigby/Rich) – 3:16
"Stupid Love!" (Hickman/Parlapiano) – 4:06
"Good" (Meyers) – 4:43
"Enuf" (Addison/Singh) – 3:00
"Always a Saint" (Hudson) – 5:02
"Little Bird of Anger" (Ackerman) – 3:21
"This Too Will Pass" (Himmelman) – 3:50
"You Reward" (Cohen) – 3:51

References

Sara Hickman albums
2006 albums